John Joyce Russell (December 1, 1897 – March 17, 1993) was an American prelate of the Roman Catholic Church, serving as bishop of the Diocese of Richmond in Virginia from 1958 to 1973.  He previously served as bishop of the Diocese of Charleston in South Carolina from 1950 to 1958.

Biography

Early life 
John Russell was born on December 1, 1897, in Baltimore, Maryland, to John and Mary (née Joyce) Russell. His relative, William Russell, had previously served as bishop of Charleston.

John Russell attended Calvert Hall College High School and Loyola High School, both in Towson, Maryland. From 1912 to 1917, he studied at St. Charles College in Ellicott City, Maryland. Russell earned his Master of Arts degree from St. Mary's Seminary in Baltimore in 1919, and a Doctor of Sacred Theology degree from the Pontifical Urbaniana University in Rome in 1923.

Priesthood 
John Russell was ordained to the priesthood in Rome by Bishop William Thomas Russell for the Archdiocese of Baltimore on July 8, 1923.  Following his return to Baltimore, John Russell served as a curate at St. Martin Parish  from1923 to 1937. He also served as diocesan director of Catholic Big Brothers and of the Holy Name Societies from 1927 to 1946). From 1929 to 1946, he was diocesan director of the Catholic Evidence Guild. 

Russell served as pastor of St. Ursula Parish in Baltimore from 1937 to 1946, and was named a domestic prelate by the Vatican in 1945. Russell then served as pastor of St. Patrick Parish in Washington, D.C. from 1946 to 1948 and as diocesan director of Catholic Charities (1946–1950). From 1948 to 1950, he was pastor of the Church of the Nativity.

Bishop of Charleston 
On January 28, 1950, Russell was appointed bishop of the Diocese of Charleston by Pope Pius XII. He received his episcopal consecration on March 14, 1950, from Archbishop Amleto Cicognani, with Archbishop Patrick O'Boyle and Bishop John Michael McNamara serving as co-consecrators.

Bishop of Richmond 
Russell was named the as the tenth bishop of the Diocese of Richmond by Pius XII on July 3, 1958; he was installed on September 30, 1958.  From 1962 to 1965, Russell attended the Second Vatican Council in Rome. In implementing the Council's reforms, Russell established a diocesan Commission on Ecumenical Affairs in 1963, and a diocesan Pastoral Council and a Council of Priests in 1966. A champion of civil rights, he had the parents of prospective students for Richmond's Catholic schools be interviewed for signs of racism.

Russell's resignation as bishop of the Diocese of Richmond was accepted by Pope Paul VI on April 28, 1973. John Russell died on March 17, 1993,  at St. Joseph's Home in Richmond at age 95.  Russell was a schoolmate of Francis J. Parater, now a Servant of God. According to the Pecorelli's list, bsp. John J. Russel was a member of Freemasonry, he and Cardinal Bernadine celebrate the 'Throne of Prince' on June/29/1963 in South Carolina at the same time with a group of Freemasony in the St. Paul Chappel in Vatican.

References

External links
Catholic-Hierarchy
Catholic Diocese of Richmond

1897 births
1993 deaths
20th-century Roman Catholic bishops in the United States
Participants in the Second Vatican Council
Pontifical Urban University alumni
Religious leaders from Baltimore
Roman Catholic Archdiocese of Baltimore
Roman Catholic bishops of Richmond
Roman Catholic bishops of Charleston
St. Mary's Seminary and University alumni